

State Ministers of JLP Administration 2020

Source:

Hon. Alando Terrelonge - Ministry of Culture, Gender, Entertainment and Sports
Hon. Homer Davis - Ministry of Local Government and Rural Development
Hon. J.C. Hutchinson - Ministry of Transport and Mining
Hon.  Juliet Cuthbert-Flynn - Ministry of Health and Wellness
Sen, the Hon. Leslie Campbell - Ministry of Foreign Affairs and Foreign Trade
Hon. Marsha Smith - Ministry of Finance and the Public Service
Hon, Dr. Norman Dunn - Ministry of Industry, Investment and Commerce
Hon. Robert Morgan - Ministry of Education, Youth and Information
Hon. Zavia Mayne - Ministry of Labour and Social Security

State Ministers of JLP Administration 2016

Source:  
Hon. Rudyard Spencer - Ministry of Finance and the Public Service 
Hon. Fayval Williams – Ministry of Finance and the Public Service  
Hon. Floyd Green - Ministry of Education, Youth and Information
Hon. Pearnel Patroe Charles Jr. - Ministry of Foreign Affairs and Foreign Trade
Hon. Clifford Everald Warmington - Ministry of Economic Growth and Job Creation, Office of the Prime Minister

State Ministers of PNP Administration 2011

Source:
Hon. Arnaldo Brown – Ministry of Foreign Affairs & Foreign Trade 
Hon. Sharon Ffolkes Abrahams - Ministry of Industry, Investment and Commerce  
Hon. Ian Hayles – Ministry of Agriculture & Fisheries  
Hon. Colin Fagan - Ministry of Local Government and Community Development 
Hon. Richard Azan - Ministry of Transport, Works & Housing  
Hon. Damion Crawford - Ministry of Tourism & Entertainment  
Hon. Julian Robinson - Ministry of Mining, Energy & ICT  
Hon. Luther Buchanan - Office of the Prime Minister

State Ministers of JLP Administration 2007 
Hon. Robert Montague – Office of the Prime Minister (OPM) (local government reform)
Hon. Daryl Vaz – OPM (project implementation and service delivery) recently information
Hon. Shahine Robinson – OPM (civic responsibilities)
Hon. Andrew Gallimore – Ministry of Labour and Social Security
Hon. Joseph Hibbert – Ministry of Transport and Works
Hon. Clifford Everald Warmington – Ministry of Water and Housing
Hon. Michael Stern – Ministry of Industry, Investment and Commerce
Hon. William J.C. Hutchinson – Ministry of Agriculture and Fisheries
Hon. Laurence Broderick – Ministry of Mining and Energy
Senator Arthur Williams – Ministry of Finance and Public Service
Senator Marlene Malahoo Forte – Ministry of Foreign Affairs and Foreign Trade
 Hon Dr. St. Aubyn Bartlett - Ministry of National Security

See also
Politics of Jamaica
Cabinet of Jamaica

References

Sources
All About Jamaica
"Ministers of State & Parliamentary Secretaries", Jamaica Information Services

Ministers of State
Jamaican politicians